Steve Richardson (born 11 February 1962) is an English former professional footballer who played as a left back, making over 300 career appearances.

Career
Born in Slough, Richardson played for Southampton, Reading and Newbury Town. He joined Basingstoke in 1995, playing for them until 2000. During his time as a player he became a coach, a job he held until becoming assistant manager in 2006.

He became caretaker manager at Basingstoke in March 2008, but left the club at the end of the season to become assistant manager at Farnborough.

References

1962 births
Living people
English footballers
Southampton F.C. players
Reading F.C. players
Newbury Town F.C. players
Basingstoke Town F.C. players
English Football League players
Basingstoke Town F.C. managers
Association football defenders
English football managers